Total number of species = 976

Nota bene: In the following list, a binomial authority in parentheses indicates that the species was originally described in a genus other than the genus to which it is currently assigned.

Testudines

Cheloniidae (4 species)
Caretta caretta (Linnaeus, 1758)
Chelonia mydas (Linnaeus, 1758)
Eretmochelys imbricata (Linnaeus, 1766)
Lepidochelys olivacea (Eschscholtz, 1829)

Dermochelyidae (1 species)
Dermochelys coriacea (Linnaeus, 1766)

Emydidae (2 species)
Trachemys adiutrix Vanzolini, 1995
Trachemys dorbigni (A.M.C. Duméril & Bibron, 1835)

Geoemydidae (1 species)
Rhinoclemmys punctularia (Daudin, 1801)

Kinosternidae (1 species)
Kinosternon scorpioides (Linnaeus, 1766)

Testudinidae (2 species)
Geochelone carbonaria Spix, 1824
Geochelone denticulata (Linnaeus, 1766)

Podocnemididae (5 species)
Peltocephalus dumerilianus (Schweigger, 1812)
Podocnemis erythrocephala (Spix, 1824)
Podocnemis expansa (Schweigger, 1812)
Podocnemis sextuberculata Cornalia, 1849
Podocnemis unifilis Troschel, 1848

Chelidae (19 species)
Nomenclature based on Rhodin et al., 2010
Acanthochelys macrocephala Rhodin, Mittermeier & McMorris, 1984
Acanthochelys radiolata (Mikan, 1820)
Acanthochelys spixii (A.M.C. Duméril & Bibron, 1835)
Batrachemys heliostemma McCord, Joseph-Ouni & Lamar, 2000
Chelus fimbriata (Schneider, 1783)
Hydromedusa maximiliani (Mikan, 1820)
Hydromedusa tectifera Cope, 1869
Mesoclemmys gibba (Schweigger, 1812)
Mesoclemmys nasuta (Schweigger, 1812)
Mesoclemmys raniceps (Gray, 1855)
Mesoclemmys tuberculata (Lüderwaldt, 1926)
Mesoclemmys vanderhaegei (Bour, 1973)
Phrynops geoffroanus (Schweigger, 1812)
Phrynops hilarii (A.M.C. Duméril & Bibron, 1835)
Phrynops tuberosus (W. Peters, 1870)
Phrynops williamsi Rhodin & Mittermeier, 1983
Platemys platycephala (Schneider, 1792)
Ranacephala hogei (Mertens, 1967)
Rhinemys rufipes (Spix, 1824)

Crocodilia

Alligatoridae (6 species)
Caiman crocodilus (Linnaeus, 1758)
Caiman latirostris (Daudin, 1802)
Caiman yacare (Daudin, 1802)
Melanosuchus niger (Spix, 1825)
Paleosuchus palpebrosus (Cuvier, 1807)
Paleosuchus trigonatus (Schneider, 1801)

Squamata

Amphisbaenidae (50 species)
Amphisbaena absaberi (Strüssmann & Carvalho, 2001)
Amphisbaena alba Linnaeus, 1758
Amphisbaena anaemariae Vanzolini, 1997
Amphisbaena anomala (Barbour, 1914)
Amphisbaena arda Rodrigues, 2003
Amphisbaena arenaria Vanzolini, 1991
Amphisbaena bahiana Vanzolini, 1964
Amphisbaena bedai (Vanzolini, 1991)
Amphisbaena bilabialata (Stimson, 1972)
Amphisbaena bolivica Mertens, 1929
Amphisbaena brasiliana (Gray, 1865)
Amphisbaena camura Cope, 1862
Amphisbaena carvalhoi Gans, 1965
Amphisbaena crisae Vanzolini, 1997
Amphisbaena cuiabana (Strüssmann & Carvalho, 2001)
Amphisbaena cunhai Hoogmoed & Ávila-Pires, 1991
Amphisbaena darwinii A.M.C. Duméril & Bibron, 1839
Amphisbaena dubia L. Müller, 1924
Amphisbaena frontalis Vanzolini, 1991
Amphisbaena fuliginosa Linnaeus, 1758
Amphisbaena hastata Vanzolini, 1991
Amphisbaena heathi K.P. Schmidt, 1936
Amphisbaena hogei Vanzolini, 1950
Amphisbaena ibijara Rodrigues, Andrade & Lima, 2003
Amphisbaena ignatiana Vanzolini, 1991
Amphisbaena kingii (Bell, 1833)
Amphisbaena kraoh (Vanzolini, 1971)
Amphisbaena leeseri Gans, 1964
Amphisbaena leucocephala W. Peters, 1878
Amphisbaena lumbricalis Vanzolini, 1996
Amphisbaena mensae Castro-Mello, 2000
Amphisbaena mertensi Strauch, 1881
Amphisbaena miringoera Vanzolini, 1971
Amphisbaena mitchelli Procter, 1923
Amphisbaena munoai Klappenbach, 1966
Amphisbaena neglecta Dunn & Piatt, 1936
Amphisbaena nigricauda Gans, 1966
Amphisbaena pretrei A.M.C. Duméril & Bibron, 1839
Amphisbaena prunicolor (Cope, 1885)
Amphisbaena ridleyi Boulenger, 1890
Amphisbaena roberti Gans, 1964
Amphisbaena sanctaeritae Vanzolini, 1994
Amphisbaena saxosa (Castro-Mello, 2003)
Amphisbaena silvestrii Boulenger, 1902
Amphisbaena slevini K.P. Schmidt, 1938
Amphisbaena steindachneri Strauch, 1881
Amphisbaena talisiae Vanzolini, 1995
Amphisbaena tragorrhectes Vanzolini, 1971
Amphisbaena vanzolinii Gans, 1963
Amphisbaena vermicularis Wagler, 1824

Rhineuridae (7 species)
Leposternon infraorbitale (Bertold, 1859)
Leposternon kisteumacheri Porto, Soares & Caramaschi, 2000
Leposternon microcephalum Wagler, 1824
Leposternon octostegum (A.H.A. Duméril, 1851)
Leposternon polystegum (A.H.A. Duméril, 1851)
Leposternon scutigerum (Hemprich, 1829)
Leposternon wuchereri (W. Peters, 1879)

Iguanidae (1 species)
Iguana iguana (Linnaeus, 1758)

Hoplocercidae (3 species)
Enyalioides laticeps (Guichenot, 1855)
Enyalioides palpebralis (Boulenger, 1883)
Hoplocercus spinosus Fitzinger, 1843

Polychrotidae (21 species)
Anisolepis grilli Boulenger, 1891
Anisolepis longicauda (Boulenger, 1891)
Anisolepis undulatus (Wiegmann, 1834)
Anolis auratus Daudin, 1802
Anolis bombiceps Cope, 1876
Anolis fuscoauratus d'Orbigny, 1837
Anolis meridionalis Boettger, 1885
Anolis nasofrontalis Amaral, 1933
Anolis nitens (Wagler, 1830)
Anolis ortonii Cope, 1868
Anolis philopunctatus Rodrigues, 1988
Anolis phyllorhinus Myers & Carvalho, 1945
Anolis pseudotigrinus Amaral, 1933
Anolis punctatus Daudin, 1802
Anolis trachyderma Cope, 1876
Anolis transversalis Duméril, 1851
Anolis williamsii Bocourt, 1870
Polychrus acutirostris Spix, 1825
Polychrus liogaster Boulenger, 1908
Polychrus marmoratus (Linnaeus, 1758)
Urostrophus vautieri A.M.C. Duméril & Bibron, 1837

Leiosauridae (7 species)
Enyalius bibronii Boulenger, 1885
Enyalius bilineatus A.M.C. Duméril & Bibron, 1837
Enyalius brasiliensis (Lesson, 1828)
Enyalius catenatus (Wied, 1821)
Enyalius iheringii Boulenger, 1885
Enyalius leechii (Boulenger, 1885)
Enyalius perditus Jackson, 1978

Tropiduridae (35 species)
Eurolophosaurus amathites (Rodrigues, 1984)
Eurolophosaurus nanuzae (Rodrigues, 1981)
Eurolophosaurus divaricatus (Rodrigues, 1984)
Liolaemus arambarensis Verrastro, Veronese, Bujes & Dias-Filho, 2003
Liolaemus lutzae Mertens, 1938
Liolaemus occipitalis Boulenger, 1885
Plica plica (Linnaeus, 1758)
Plica umbra (Linnaeus, 1758)
Stenocercus azureus (F. Müller, 1882)
Stenocercus caducus (Cope, 1862)
Stenocercus dumerilii (Steindachner, 1867)
Stenocercus fimbriatus Ávila-Pires, 1995
Stenocercus roseiventris D'Orbigny, 1837
Stenocercus tricristatus (A.H.A. Duméril, 1851)
Strobilurus torquatus Wiegmann, 1834
Tropidurus cocorobensis Rodrigues, 1987
Tropidurus erythrocephalus Rodrigues, 1987
Tropidurus etheridgei Cei, 1982
Tropidurus guarani (Cope, 1862)
Tropidurus helenae (Manzani & Abe, 1990)
Tropidurus hispidus (Spix, 1825)
Tropidurus hygomi J.T. Reinhardt & Luetken, 1861
Tropidurus insulanus Rodrigues, 1987
Tropidurus itambere Rodrigues, 1987
Tropidurus montanus Rodrigues, 1987
Tropidurus mucujensis Rodrigues, 1987
Tropidurus oreadicus Rodrigues, 1987
Tropidurus pinima (Rodrigues, 1984)
Tropidurus psammonastes Rodrigues, Kasahara & Yonenaga-Yasuda, 1988
Tropidurus semitaeniatus (Spix, 1825)
Tropidurus spinulosus (Cope, 1862)
Tropidurus torquatus (Wied, 1820)
Uracentron azureum (Linnaeus, 1758)
Uracentron flaviceps (Guichenot, 1855)
Uranoscodon superciliosus (Linnaeus, 1758)

Gekkonidae (29 species)
Briba brasiliana Amaral, 1935
Coleodactylus amazonicus (Andersson, 1918)
Coleodactylus brachystoma (Amaral, 1935)
Coleodactylus meridionalis (Boulenger, 1888)
Coleodactylus natalensis Freire, 1999
Coleodactylus septentrionalis (Vanzolini, 1980)
Gonatodes annularis Boulenger, 1887
Gonatodes eladioi Nascimento, Ávila-Pires & Cunha, 1987
Gonatodes hasemani Griffin, 1917
Gonatodes humeralis (Guichenot, 1855)
Gonatodes tapajonicus Rodrigues, 1980
Gymnodactylus darwinii (Gray, 1845)
Gymnodactylus geckoides Spix, 1825
Gymnodactylus guttulatus Vanzolini, 1982
Hemidactylus agrius Vanzolini, 1978
Hemidactylus mabouia (Moreau de Jonnès, 1818)
Hemidactylus palaichthus Kluge, 1969
Homonota fasciata (A.M.C. Duméril & Bibron, 1836)
Homonota uruguayensis (Vaz-Ferreira & Sierra de Soriano, 1961)
Lepidoblepharis heyerorum Vanzolini, 1978
Lepidoblepharis hoogmoedi Ávila-Pires, 1995
Lygodactylus klugei (H.M. Smith, Martin & Swain, 1977)
Lygodactylus wetzeli (H.M. Smith, Martin & Swain, 1977)
Phyllopezus lutzae Loveridge, 1941
Phyllopezus periosus Rodrigues, 1986
Phyllopezus pollicaris (Spix, 1825)
Pseudogonatodes gasconi Ávila-Pires & Hoogmoed, 2000
Pseudogonatodes guianensis Parker, 1935
Thecadactylus rapicauda (Houttuyn, 1782)

Anguidae (5 species)
Diploglossus fasciatus (Gray, 1831)
Diploglossus lessonae Peracca, 1890
Ophiodes striatus (Spix, 1824)
Ophiodes vertebralis Bocourt, 1881
Ophiodes yacupoi Gallardo, 1966

Teiidae (31 species)
Ameiva ameiva (Linnaeus, 1758)
Cnemidophorus abaetensis Dias, Rocha & Vrcibradic, 2002
Cnemidophorus cryptus Cole & Dessauer, 1993
Cnemidophorus lacertoides A.M.C. Duméril & Bibron, 1839
Cnemidophorus lemniscatus (Linnaeus, 1758)
Cnemidophorus littoralis Rocha, Araújo, Vrcibradic & Costa, 2000
Cnemidophorus mumbuca Colli et al., 2003
Cnemidophorus nativo Rocha, Bergallo & Peccinini-Seale, 1997
Cnemidophorus ocellifer (Spix, 1825)
Cnemidophorus parecis Colli et al., 2003
Cnemidophorus vacariensis Feltrim & Lema, 2000
Crocodilurus amazonicus Spix, 1825
Dracaena guianensis Daudin, 1802
Dracaena paraguayensis Amaral, 1950
Kentropyx altamazonica (Cope, 1876)
Kentropyx calcarata Spix, 1825
Kentropyx intermedia (Gray, 1831)
Kentropyx paulensis Boettger, 1893
Kentropyx pelviceps Cope, 1868
Kentropyx striata (Daudin, 1802)
Kentropyx vanzoi Gallagher & Dixon, 1980
Kentropyx viridistriga Boulenger, 1894
Teius oculatus (D'Orbigny & Bibron, 1837)
Teius teyou (Daudin, 1802)
Tupinambis duseni Lönnberg, 1896
Tupinambis longilineus Ávila-Pires, 1995
Tupinambis merianae (A.M.C. Duméril & Bibron, 1839)
Tupinambis palustris Manzani & Abe, 2002
Tupinambis quadrilineatus Manzani & Abe, 1997
Tupinambis rufescens (Günther, 1871)
Tupinambis teguixin (Linnaeus, 1758)

Gymnophthalmidae (71 species)
Alopoglossus angulatus (Linnaeus, 1758)
Alopoglossus atriventris Duellman, 1973
Alopoglossus buckleyi (O'Shaughnessy, 1881)
Amapasaurus tetradactylus Cunha,
Anotosaura collaris Amaral, 1933
Anotosaura vanzolinia Dixon, 1974
Arthrosaura kockii (Lidth de Jeune, 1904)
Arthrosaura reticulata (O'Shaughnessy, 1881)
Bachia bresslaui (Amaral, 1935)
Bachia cacerensis Castrillon & Strüssmann, 1998
Bachia dorbignyi (A.M.C. Duméril & Bibron, 1839)
Bachia flavescens (Bonnaterre, 1789)
Bachia panoplia Thomas, 1965
Bachia peruana (F. Werner, 1901)
Bachia scolecoides Vanzolini, 1961
Bachia trisanale (Cope, 1868)
Calyptommatus confusionibus Rodrigues, Zaher & Curcio, 2001
Calyptommatus leiolepis Rodrigues, 1991
Calyptommatus nicterus Rodrigues, 1991
Calyptommatus sinebrachiatus Rodrigues, 1991
Cercosaura argulus W. Peters, 1863
Cercosaura eigenmanni (Griffin, 1917)
Cercosaura ocellata Wagler, 1830
Cercosaura oshaughnessyi (Boulenger, 1885)
Cercosaura quadrilineatus (Boettger, 1876)
Cercosaura schreibersii Wiegmann, 1834
Colobodactylus dalcyanus Vanzolini & Ramos, 1977
Colobodactylus taunayi (Amaral, 1933)
Colobosaura mentalis Amaral, 1933
Colobosaura modesta (J.T. Reinhardt & Luetken, 1862)
Colobosauroides carvalhoi Soares & Caramaschi, 1998
Colobosauroides cearensis Cunha, Lima-Verde & Lima, 1991
Ecpleopus gaudichaudii A.M.C. Duméril & Bibron, 1839
Gymnophthalmus leucomystax Vanzolini & Carvalho, 1991
Gymnophthalmus underwoodi Grant, 1958
Gymnophthalmus vanzoi Carvalho, 1999
Heterodactylus imbricatus Spix, 1825
Heterodactylus lundii (J.T. Reinhardt & Luetken, 1862)
Iphisa elegans Gray, 1851
Leposoma annectans Ruibal, 1952
Leposoma baturitensis Rodrigues & Borges, 1997
Leposoma guianense Ruibal, 1952
Leposoma nanodactylus Rodrigues, 1997
Leposoma osvaldoi Ávila-Pires, 1995
Leposoma parietale (Cope, 1885)
Leposoma percarinatum (L. Müller, 1923)
Leposoma puk Rodrigues, 2002
Leposoma scincoides Spix, 1825
Leposoma snethlageae Ávila-Pires, 1995
Micrablepharus atticolus Rodrigues, 1996
Micrablepharus maximiliani (J.T. Reinhardt & Luetken, 1862)
Neusticurus bicarinatus (Linnaeus, 1758)
Neusticurus ecpleopus Cope, 1875
Neusticurus juruazensis Ávila-Pires & Vitt, 1998
Neusticurus ocellatus Sinitsin, 1930
Neusticurus racenisi Roze, 1958
Neusticurus rudis Boulenger, 1900
Neusticurus tatei C.E. Burt & M.D. Burt, 1931
Nothobachia ablephara Rodrigues, 1984
Placosoma cipoense Cunha, 1966
Placosoma cordylinum Tschudi, 1847
Placosoma glabellum (W. Peters, 1870)
Procellosaurinus erythrocercus Rodrigues, 1991
Procellosaurinus tetradactylus Rodrigues, 1991
Psilophthalmus paeminosus Rodrigues, 1991
Ptychoglossus brevifrontalis Boulenger, 1912
Rachysaurus brachylepis (Dixon, 1974)
Stenolepis ridleyi Boulenger, 1887
Tretioscincus agilis (Ruthven, 1916)
Tretioscincus oriximinensis Ávila-Pires, 1995
Vanzosaura rubricauda (Boulenger, 1902)

Scincidae (14 species)
Mabuya agilis (Raddi, 1823)
Mabuya agmosticha Rodrigues, 2000
Mabuya arajara Rebouças-Spieker, 1981
Mabuya bistriata (Spix, 1825)
Mabuya caissara Rebouças-Spieker, 1974
Mabuya carvalhoi Rebouças-Spieker & Vanzolini, 1990
Mabuya dorsivittata Cope, 1862
Mabuya frenata (Cope, 1862)
Mabuya guaporicola Dunn, 1936
Mabuya heathi K.P. Schmidt & Inger, 1951
Mabuya macrorhyncha Hoge, 1947
Mabuya nigropalmata Andersson, 1918
Mabuya nigropunctata (Spix, 1825)
Trachylepis atlantica (K.P. Schmidt, 1945)

Squamata - Serpentes

Anomalepididae (4 species)
Liotyphlops beui (Amaral, 1924)
Liotyphlops ternetzii (Boulenger, 1896)
Liotyphlops wilderi (Garman, 1883)
Typhlophis squamosus (Schlegel, 1839)

Leptotyphlopidae (12 species)
Leptotyphlops albifrons (Wagler, 1824)
Leptotyphlops australis Freiberg & Orejas-Miranda, 1968
Leptotyphlops borapeliotes Vanzolini, 1996
Leptotyphlops brasiliensis Laurent, 1949
Leptotyphlops cupinensis Bailey & Carvalho, 1946
Leptotyphlops diaplocius Orejas-Miranda, 1969
Leptotyphlops dimidiatus (Jan, 1861)
Leptotyphlops koppesi Amaral, 1955
Leptotyphlops macrolepis (W. Peters, 1857)
Leptotyphlops munoai Orejas-Miranda, 1961
Leptotyphlops salgueiroi Amaral, 1955
Leptotyphlops septemstriatus (Schneider, 1801)

Typhlopidae (6 species)
Typhlops amoipira Rodrigues & Juncá, 2002
Typhlops brongersmianus Vanzolini, 1976
Typhlops minuisquamus Dixon & Hendricks, 1979
Typhlops paucisquamus Dixon & Hendricks, 1979
Typhlops reticulatus (Linnaeus, 1758)
Typhlops yonenagae Rodrigues, 1991

Aniliidae (1 species)
Anilius scytale (Linnaeus, 1758)

Tropidophiidae (1 species)
Tropidophis paucisquamis (F. Müller, 1901)

Boidae (8 species)
Boa constrictor Linnaeus, 1758
Corallus caninus (Linnaeus, 1758)
Corallus cropanii (Hoge, 1953)
Corallus hortulanus (Linnaeus, 1758)
Epicrates cenchria (Linnaeus, 1758)
Eunectes deschauenseei Dunn & Conant, 1936
Eunectes murinus (Linnaeus, 1758)
Eunectes notaeus Cope, 1862

Colubridae (238 species)
Apostolepis albicolaris Lema, 2002
Apostolepis ambinigra (W. Peters, 1869)
Apostolepis arenaria Rodrigues, 1992
Apostolepis assimilis (J.T. Reinhardt, 1861)
Apostolepis cearensis Gomes, 1915
Apostolepis cerradoensis Lema, 2003
Apostolepis christineae Lema, 2002
Apostolepis dimidiata (Jan, 1862)
Apostolepis dorbignyi (Schlegel, 1837)
Apostolepis flavotorquata (A.M.C. Duméril, Bibron & A.H.A. Duméril, 1854)
Apostolepis gaboi Rodrigues, 1992
Apostolepis goiasensis Prado, 1942
Apostolepis intermedia Koslowsky, 1898
Apostolepis lineata Cope, 1887
Apostolepis longicaudata Amaral, 1921
Apostolepis niceforoi Amaral, 1935
Apostolepis nigroterminata Boulenger, 1896
Apostolepis polylepis Amaral, 1921
Apostolepis pymi Boulenger, 1903
Apostolepis quirogai Giraudo & Scrocchi, 1998
Apostolepis rondoni Amaral, 1925
Apostolepis sanctaeritae F. Werner, 1924
Apostolepis vittata (Cope, 1887)
Atractus albuquerquei Cunha & Nascimento, 1983
Atractus alphonsehogei Cunha & Nascimento, 1983
Atractus badius (F. Boie, 1827)
Atractus elaps (Günther, 1858)
Atractus flammigerus (F. Boie, 1827)
Atractus guentheri (Wucherer, 1861)
Atractus insipidus Roze, 1961
Atractus latifrons (Günther, 1868)
Atractus maculatus Günther, 1858
Atractus major Boulenger, 1894
Atractus natans Hoogmoed & Prudente, 2003
Atractus pantostictus Fernandes & Puorto, 1993
Atractus poeppigi (Jan, 1862)
Atractus potschi Fernandes, 1995
Atractus reticulatus (Boulenger, 1885)
Atractus schach (Boie, 1827)
Atractus serranus Amaral, 1930
Atractus snethlageae Cunha & Nascimento, 1983
Atractus taeniatus Griffin, 1916
Atractus torquatus (A.M. C. Duméril, Bibron & A.H.A. Duméril, 1854)
Atractus trihedrurus Amaral, 1926
Atractus trilineatus Wagler, 1828
Atractus zebrinus (Jan, 1862)
Atractus zidoki Gasc & Rodrigues, 1979
Boiruna maculata (Boulenger, 1896)
Boiruna sertaneja Zaher, 1996
Calamodontophis paucidens (Amaral, 1935)
Cercophis auratus (Schlegel, 1837)
Chironius bicarinatus (Wied, 1820)
Chironius carinatus (Linnaeus, 1758)
Chironius exoletus (Linnaeus, 1758)
Chironius flavolineatus (Boettger, 1885)
Chironius fuscus (Linnaeus, 1758)
Chironius laevicollis (Wied, 1824)
Chironius laurenti Dixon, Wiest & Cei, 1993
Chironius multiventris K.P. Schmidt & Walker, 1943
Chironius quadricarinatus (F. Boie, 1827)
Chironius scurrulus (Wagler, 1824)
Chlorosoma viridissimum (Linnaeus, 1758)
Clelia bicolor (Peracca, 1904)
Clelia clelia (Daudin, 1803)
Clelia hussami Morato, Franco & Sanches, 2003
Clelia montana Franco, Marques & Puorto, 1997
Clelia plumbea (Wied, 1820)
Clelia quimi Franco, Marques & Puorto, 1997
Clelia rustica (Cope, 1878)
Dendrophidion dendrophis (Schlegel, 1837)
Dipsas albifrons (Sauvage, 1884)
Dipsas alternans (Fischer, 1885)
Dipsas catesbyi (Sentzen, 1796)
Dipsas incerta (Jan, 1863)
Dipsas indica Laurenti, 1768
Dipsas neivai (Amaral, 1926)
Dipsas pavonina Schlegel, 1837
Dipsas variegata (A.M.C. Duméril, Bibron & A.H.A. Duméril, 1854)
Ditaxodon taeniatus (Hensel, 1868)
Drepanoides anomalus (Jan, 1863)
Drymarchon corais (F. Boie, 1827)
Drymobius rhombifer (Günther, 1860)
Drymoluber brazili (Gomes, 1918)
Drymoluber dichrous (W. Peters, 1863)
Echinanthera affinis (Günther, 1858)
Echinanthera amoena (Jan, 1863)
Echinanthera bilineata (Fischer, 1885)
Echinanthera brevirostris (W. Peters, 1863)
Echinanthera cephalomaculata Di-Bernardo, 1994
Echinanthera cephalostriata Di-Bernardo, 1996
Echinanthera cyanopleura (Cope, 1885)
Echinanthera melanostigma (Wagler, 1824)
Echinanthera occipitalis (Jan, 1863)
Echinanthera persimilis (Cope, 1869)
Echinanthera poecilopogon (Cope, 1863)
Echinanthera undulata (Wied, 1824)
Elapomorphus lepidus J.T. Reinhardt, 1861
Elapomorphus quinquelineatus (Raddi, 1820)
Elapomorphus wuchereri Günther, 1861
Erythrolamprus aesculapii (Linnaeus, 1766)
Erythrolamprus mimus (Cope, 1868)
Gomesophis brasiliensis (Gomes, 1918)
Helicops angulatus (Linnaeus, 1758)
Helicops carinicauda (Wied, 1825)
Helicops gomesi Amaral, 1921
Helicops hagmanni Roux, 1910
Helicops infrataeniatus (Jan, 1865)
Helicops leopardinus (Schlegel, 1837)
Helicops modestus Günther, 1861
Helicops polylepis Günther, 1861
Helicops trivittatus (Gray, 1849)
Hydrodynastes bicinctus (Herrmann, 1804)
Hydrodynastes gigas (A.M.C. Duméril, Bibron & A.H.A. Duméril, 1854)
Hydrops martii (Wagler, 1824)
Hydrops triangularis (Wagler, 1824)
Imantodes cenchoa (Linnaeus, 1758)
Leptodeira annulata (Linnaeus, 1758)
Leptophis ahaetulla (Linnaeus, 1758)
Lioheterophis iheringi Amaral, 1935
Liophis almadensis (Wagler, 1824)
Liophis amarali Wettstein, 1930
Liophis anomalus (Günther, 1858)
Liophis atraventer Dixon & Thomas, 1985
Liophis breviceps Cope, 1861
Liophis carajasensis Cunha, Nascimento & Ávila-Pires, 1985
Liophis cobella (Linnaeus, 1758)
Liophis dilepis (Cope, 1862)
Liophis festae (Peracca, 1897)
Liophis flavifrenatus (Cope, 1862)
Liophis frenatus (F. Werner, 1909)
Liophis jaegeri (Günther, 1858)
Liophis lineatus (Linnaeus, 1758)
Liophis maryellenae Dixon, 1985
Liophis meridionalis (Schenkel, 1901)
Liophis miliaris (Linnaeus, 1758)
Liophis mossoroensis Hoge & Lima-Verde, 1972
Liophis paucidens (Hoge, 1953)
Liophis poecilogyrus (Wied, 1824)
Liophis reginae (Linnaeus, 1758)
Liophis taeniogaster Jan, 1863
Liophis typhlus (Linnaeus, 1758)
Liophis viridis Günther, 1862
Lystrophis dorbignyi (A.M.C. Duméril, Bibron & A.H.A. Duméril, 1854)
Lystrophis histricus (Jan, 1863)
Lystrophis matogrossensis Scrocchi & Cruz, 1993
Lystrophis nattereri (Steindachner, 1867)
Masticophis mentovarius (A.M.C. Duméril, Bibron & A.H.A. Duméril, 1854)
Mastigodryas bifossatus (Raddi, 1820)
Mastigodryas boddaerti (Sentzen, 1796)
Ninia hudsoni Parker, 1940
Oxybelis aeneus (Wagler, 1824)
Oxybelis fulgidus (Daudin, 1803)
Oxyrhopus clathratus A.M.C. Duméril, Bibron & A.H.A. Duméril, 1854
Oxyrhopus formosus (Wied, 1820)
Oxyrhopus guibei Hoge & Romano, 1977
Oxyrhopus melanogenys (Tschudi, 1845)
Oxyrhopus petola (Linnaeus, 1758)
Oxyrhopus rhombifer A.M.C. Duméril, Bibron & A.H.A. Duméril, 1854
Oxyrhopus trigeminus A.M.C. Duméril, Bibron & A.H.A. Duméril, 1854
Phalotris concolor Ferrarezzi, 1993
Phalotris lativittatus Ferrarezzi, 1993
Phalotris lemniscatus (A.M.C. Duméril, Bibron & A.H.A. Duméril, 1854)
Phalotris mertensi (Hoge, 1955)
Phalotris multipunctatus Puorto & Ferrarezzi, 1993
Phalotris nasutus (Gomes, 1915)
Phalotris tricolor Cope, 1861
Philodryas aestiva (A.M.C. Duméril, Bibron & A.H.A. Duméril, 1854)
Philodryas arnaldoi (Amaral, 1932)
Philodryas livida (Amaral, 1923)
Philodryas mattogrossensis Koslowsky, 1898
Philodryas nattereri Steindachner, 1870
Philodryas olfersii (Lichtenstein, 1823)
Philodryas oligolepis Gomes, 1921
Philodryas patagoniensis (Girard, 1857)
Philodryas psammophidea Günther, 1872
Phimophis chui Rodrigues, 1993
Phimophis guerini (A.M.C. Duméril, Bibron & A.H.A. Duméril, 1854)
Phimophis guianensis (Troschel, 1848)
Phimophis iglesiasi (Gomes, 1915)
Phimophis scriptorcibatus Rodrigues, 1993
Pseudablabes agassizii (Jan, 1863)
Pseudoboa coronata Schneider, 1801
Pseudoboa haasi (Boettger, 1905)
Pseudoboa neuwiedii (A.M.C. Duméril, Bibron & A.H.A. Duméril, 1854)
Pseudoboa nigra (A.M.C. Duméril, Bibron & A.H.A. Duméril, 1854)
Pseudoboa serrana Morato, Moura-Leite, Prudente & Bérnils, 1995
Pseudoeryx plicatilis (Linnaeus, 1758)
Pseustes cinnamomeus (Wagler, 1824)
Pseustes poecilonotus (Günther, 1858)
Pseustes sexcarinatus (Wagler, 1824)
Pseustes sulphureus (Wagler, 1824)
Psomophis genimaculatus (Boettger, 1885)
Psomophis joberti (Sauvage, 1884)
Psomophis obtusus (Cope, 1864)
Ptychophis flavovirgatus Gomes, 1915
Rhachidelus brazili Boulenger, 1908
Rhinobothryum lentiginosum (Scopoli, 1785)
Sibon nebulata (Linnaeus, 1758)
Sibynomorphus mikanii (Schlegel, 1837)
Sibynomorphus neuwiedi (Ihering, 1911)
Sibynomorphus turgidus (Cope, 1868)
Sibynomorphus ventrimaculatus (Boulenger, 1885)
Simophis rhinostoma (Schlegel, 1837)
Siphlophis cervinus (Laurenti, 1768)
Siphlophis compressus (Daudin, 1803)
Siphlophis leucocephalus (Günther, 1863)
Siphlophis longicaudatus (Andersson, 1907)
Siphlophis pulcher (Raddi, 1820)
Siphlophis worontzowi (Prado, 1940)
Sordellina punctata (W. Peters, 1880)
Spilotes pullatus (Linnaeus, 1758)
Taeniophallus nicagus (Cope, 1895)
Tantilla boipiranga Sawaya & Sazima, 2003
Tantilla melanocephala (Linnaeus, 1758)
Thamnodynastes almae Franco & Ferreira, 2003
Thamnodynastes chaquensis Bergna & Alvarez, 1993
Thamnodynastes hypoconia (Cope, 1860)
Thamnodynastes longicaudus Franco, Ferreira. Marques & Sazima, 2003
Thamnodynastes pallidus (Linnaeus, 1758)
Thamnodynastes rutilus (Prado, 1942)
Thamnodynastes strigatus (Günther, 1858)
Tomodon dorsatus A.M.C. Duméril, Bibron & A.H.A. Duméril, 1854
Tomodon ocellatus A.M.C. Duméril, Bibron & A.H.A. Duméril, 1854
Tropidodryas serra (Schlegel, 1837)
Tropidodryas striaticeps (Cope, 1869)
Umbrivaga pygmaea (Cope, 1868)
Uromacerina ricardinii (Peracca, 1897)
Urotheca euryzona Cope, 1862
Waglerophis merremii (Wagler, 1824)
Xenodon guentheri Boulenger, 1894
Xenodon neuwiedii Günther, 1863
Xenodon rhabdocephalus (Wied, 1824)
Xenodon severus (Linnaeus, 1758)
Xenopholis scalaris (Wucherer, 1861)
Xenopholis undulatus (Jensen, 1900)
Xenoxybelis argenteus (Daudin, 1803)
Xenoxybelis boulengeri (Procter, 1923)

Elapidae (34 species)
Leptomicrurus collaris (Schlegel, 1837)
Leptomicrurus narduccii (Jan, 1863)
Leptomicrurus scutiventris (Cope, 1870)
Micrurus altirostris (Cope, 1860)
Micrurus annelatus (W. Peters, 1871)
Micrurus averyi K.P. Schmidt, 1939
Micrurus albicinctus (Amaral, 1926)
Micrurus brasiliensis Roze, 1967
Micrurus boicora (Bernarde, Turci, Abegg & Franco, 2018)
Micrurus corallinus (Merrem, 1820)
Micrurus decoratus (Jan, 1858)
Micrurus diana (Rose, 1983)
Micrurus filiformis (Günther, 1859)
Micrurus frontalis (A.M.C. Duméril, Bibron & A.H.A. Duméril, 1854)
Micrurus hemprichii (Jan, 1858)
Micrurus ibiboboca (Merrem, 1820)
Micrurus isoznus (Cope, 1860)
Micrurus langsdorffii Wagler, 1824
Micrurus lemniscatus (Linnaeus, 1758)
Micrurus pacaraimae Carvalho, 2002
Micrurus paraensis Cunha & Nascimento, 1973
Micrurus psyches (Daudin, 1803)
Micrurus pyrrhocryptus (Cope, 1862)
Micrurus potyguara (Pires, Silva, Fitosa, Prudentes, Pereira filho e Zaher, 2014)
Micrurus putumayensis (Lancini, 1962)
Micrurus spixii Wagler, 1824
Micrurus surinamensis (Cuvier, 1817)
Micrurus silviae (Di-Bernardo, Borges Martins & Silva, 2007)
Micrurus tricolor Hoge, 1956
Micrurus tikuna (Feitosa Da ilva, Pires, Zaher & Prudente, 2015)
Micrurus remotus (Roze, 1987)
Micrurus ornatissimus (Jan, 1858)
Micrurus nattereri (Schmidt, 1952)
Micrurus mipartitus (Duméril, Bibron & Duméril)

Viperidae (31 species)
Bothrocophias hyoprora (Amaral, 1935)
Bothrocophias microphthalmus (Cope, 1875)
Bothrops alcatraz Marques, Martins & Sazima, 2002
Bothrops alternatus A.M.C. Duméril, Bibron & A.H.A. Duméril, 1854
Bothrops atrox (Linnaeus, 1758)
Bothrops bilineatus (Wied, 1825)
Bothrops brazili Hoge, 1954
Bothrops cotiara (Gomes, 1913)
Bothrops diporus Cope, 1862
Bothrops erythromelas Amaral, 1923
Bothrops fonsecai Hoge & Belluomini, 1959
Bothrops insularis (Amaral, 1921)
Bothrops itapetiningae (Boulenger, 1907)
Bothrops jararaca (Wied, 1824)
Bothrops jararacussu Lacerda, 1884
Bothrops leucurus Wagler, 1824
Bothrops lutzi (Miranda-Ribeiro, 1915)
Bothrops marajoensis Hoge, 1966
Bothrops mattogrossensis Amaral, 1925
Bothrops moojeni Hoge, 1966
Bothrops muriciensis Ferrarezzi & Freire, 2001
Bothrops marmoratus (Silva & Rodrigues, 2008)
Bothrops neuwiedi Wagler, 1824
Bothrops pauloensis Amaral, 1925
Bothrops pirajai Amaral, 1923
Bothrops pubescens (Cope, 1870)
Bothrops taeniatus (Wagler, 1824)
Bothrops otavioi (Barbo, Grazziotin, Sazima, Martins & Sawaya, 2012)
Bothrops sazimai (Barbo, Gasparini, Almeida, Zaher, Grazziotin, Gusmão, Ferrarini & Sawaya, 2016)
Crotalus durissus Linnaeus, 1758
Lachesis muta (Linnaeus, 1766)

See also
 Wildlife of Brazil
 List of amphibians in Brazil
 List of Brazilian birds
 List of Brazilian mammals
 List of regional reptiles lists

References

 Sociedade Brasileira de Herpetologia (SBH), 2011 - Lista de espécies de répteis do Brasil.
 T.C.S. Avila-Pires, Lizards of Brazilian Amazonia (Reptilia: Until now (November 2011) there are 732 recognized reptile species that naturally occur and reproduce in Brazil: 36 turtles, 6 alligators, 248 lizards, 67 amphisbaenas, and 375 snakes.

External links
 Sazima Network - Papers, Pictures and Blog by Sazima.
 Lista de cobras corais do Brasil

Brazil
Reptiles

Brazil